Chromosome X open reading frame 36 (CXorf36) is a gene that in humans encodes a protein “hypothetical protein LOC79742”. This protein has a function that is not currently very well understood. Other known aliases are “FLJ14103, DKFZp313K0825, FLJ55198, PRO3743, FLJ55198, hCG1981635, bA435K1.1,” and “4930578C19Rik.”



Gene
The CXorf36 gene is located at Xp11.3. It can be transcribed into 8 different transcript variants, which in turn can produce 6 different isoforms of the protein.
The genomic DNA is 52,529 base pairs long, while the longest mRNA that it produces is 4,735 bases long.

Gene Neighborhood
CXorf36 is closely surrounded by the following genes on chromosome X:
DUSP21
KDM6A
MIR222
TBX20
CXorf36 is also surrounded by two other genes on chromosome X that have been implicated in X-linked mental retardation.
Synaptophysin
CASK

Protein
The longest protein isoform that is produced by the CXorf36 gene is termed hypothetical protein LOC79742 isoform 1 and is 433 amino acids long. The protein has a predicated molecular weight of 48.6 kDa and isoelectric point of 8.11.

Domains
The CXorf36 gene protein product contains a region of low complexity from position 16 to position 40.

Post-translational Modification
The CXorf36 protein is predicted to undergo phosphorylation at several serines, threonines, and tyrosines throughout the structure. However, many of these sites are predicted at serines. There is also a predicted N-linked glycosylation site at position 100 on the protein product.

Expression
CXorf36 is shown to be expressed ubiquitously at low levels in various tissues throughout the body. It is expressed highly in the ciliary ganglion, ovary, and uterus corpus. However, highest expression is seen in the trigeminal ganglion tissue.

Conservation 
CXorf36 has one paralog in humans known as C3orf58. Orthologs have been found in all mammals and through numerous eukaryotes. However, conservation of the full gene halts past this, most likely a result of duplication from the ancestral gene into CXorf36 and C3orf58. The full list of organisms in which orthologs have been found is given below.

 Pongo abelii
 Macaca mulatta
 Callithrix jacchus
 Canis familiaris
 Ailuropoda melanoleuca
 Equus caballus
 Oryctolagus cuniculus
 Mus musculus
 Rattus norvegicus
 Monodelphis domestica
 Ornithorhynchus anatinus
 Taeniopygia guttata
 Gallus gallus
 Danio rerio
 Bos taurus

References

External links

Further reading

Human proteins
Uncharacterized proteins